Vincent Redetzki (born 1 April 1992) is a German actor.

Career 

Redetzki was born in Charlottenburg, Berlin, Germany. At the age of nine, he played his first small role in a play at the Theater am Kurfürstendamm. Two years later in 2003, he played his first leading role in the play Unter Eis (Under Ice) by Falk Richter at the Schaubühne in Berlin. Since then, he has played in a few plays of Richter: (2006 Die Verstörung, 2007 Im Ausnahmezustand, 2009 Trust)

In 2003 he played the child leading role in Andreas Dresen's Movie Summer in Berlin (Original: Sommer vorm Balkon) and continued his work in playing the character Willi in the German teen movie Wild Chicks (2006), Wild Chicks in Love (2007) and Wild Chicks and Life (2009).

The TV-Mini-Series Die Wölfe, with Redetzki in one of the leading roles, won the Emmy Award in 2009 as best TV Movie/Mini-Series, and the kids ensemble received the German Television Promotional Award.

Filmography

Film 
 2004: Stauffenberg, as Berthold Junior Stauffenberg
 2005: Summer in Berlin, as Max
 2006: Wild Chicks, as Willi
 2007: Wild Chicks in Love, as Willi
 2009: Wild Chicks and Life, as Willi
 2009: For Miriam (Shortfilm), as Lukas Fleißer
 2010: The Coming Days, as Phillip
 2013: , as Martin
 2014: Jack
 2015: Buddha's Little Finger

TV 
 1998: Gute Zeiten, schlechte Zeiten
 2003: Für alle Fälle Stefanie
 2004: Was heißt hier Oma (by Ariane Zeller)
 2005:  (by Dror Zahavi)
 2009: Die Wölfe (by Friedemann Fromm)
 2009: Tatort: Mit ruhiger Hand (by Maris Pfeiffer)
 2010: Leipzig Homicide (by Maris Pfeiffer)
 2010: Der Doc und die Hexe (by Vivian Naefe)
 2011: Tatort:  (by Thomas Freundner)
 2011: Mittlere Reife (by Martin Enlen)
 2011: Der Doc und die Hexe (Part 3 and 4) (by Vivian Naefe)
 2012: Tatort: Im Namen des Vaters (by Lars Kraume)
 2022: Kleo

Theatre 

 2009: TRUST of Falk Richter, Schaubühne am Lehniner Platz, Berlin
 2009: Endstation Sehnsucht (By: Benedict Andrews)
 2007: Im Ausnahmezustand of Falk Richter (UA), Schaubühne am Lehniner Platz, Berlin
 2005: Die Verstörung of Falk Richter (UA), Schaubühne am Lehniner Platz, Berlin
 2005: Stoning Mary, Schaubühne am Lehniner Platz
 2004: Phaidras Liebe, Schaubühne am Lehniner Platz
 2004: Unter Eis of Falk Richter (UA), Schaubühne am Lehniner Platz, Berlin
 2001: Macbeth
 2001: Fenster zum Flur, Theater am Kurfürstendamm

Awards  
 2009: German Television Promotional Award for Die Wölfe
 2006: Undine Award as Best Filmdebut in Summer in Berlin

External links 
 
  Redetzki's Agency
  Redetzki at the Schaubühne Berlin
 
 Morgens Schulbank, abends Bühne von Karsten Kammholz, Welt Online, 18. März 2006
 Vincent Redetzki, Theater-Jungstar und Zehntklässler von Tobias Becker, Spiegel Online vom 20. Dezember 2007

Living people
1992 births
German male film actors
German male television actors
German male child actors
Male actors from Berlin